Hymenaea torrei is a species of legume in the family Fabaceae. It is found only in Cuba. It is threatened by habitat loss.

References

torrei
Endemic flora of Cuba
Vulnerable plants
Taxonomy articles created by Polbot